Cascade is a rural city in and the county seat of Valley County, Idaho, United States. The population was 939 at the 2010 census, down from 997 in 2000.

History
The Cascade Dam across the Payette River was completed in 1948, and is located in the north end of the city. The dam created Cascade Reservoir along the west side of the city. With the introduction of nearby Tamarack Resort in 2004, the name was officially changed to Lake Cascade for marketing reasons.

Cascade was the home of a sizable Boise Cascade sawmill, which closed in May 2001.

Geography

Minor earthquake
A minor earthquake here in 1977 measured 4.5 on the Richter scale and lasted over a minute; felt across the region, it was centered near Cascade and occurred in the early hours of Sunday, November 27.

Climate
Cascade experiences a humid continental climate (Köppen abbreviation Dsb) with long, cold, snowy winters and short, warm, dry summers.

Demographics

2010 census
As of the census of 2010, there were 939 people, 416 households, and 256 families residing in the city. The racial makeup of the city was 96.5% White, 0.2% African American, 0.9% Native American, 0.2% Asian, 0.6% from other races, and 1.6% from two or more races. Hispanic or Latino of any race were 2.7% of the population.

There were 416 households, of which 24.5% had children under the age of 18 living with them, 48.6% were married couples living together, 9.6% had a female householder with no husband present, 3.4% had a male householder with no wife present, and 38.5% were non-families. 32.0% of all households were made up of individuals, and 12.5% had someone living alone who was 65 years of age or older. The average household size was 2.20 and the average family size was 2.77.

The median age in the city was 46.4 years. 19.6% of residents were under the age of 18; 8.7% were between the ages of 18 and 24; 19.9% were from 25 to 44; 33.9% were from 45 to 64; and 18% were 65 years of age or older. The gender makeup of the city was 50.7% male and 49.3% female.

2000 census
As of the census of 2000, there were 997 people, 421 households, and 282 families residing in the city. The racial makeup of the city was 95.59% White, 0.10% African American, 0.40% Native American, 0.30% Asian, 0.10% Pacific Islander, 1.60% from other races, and 1.91% from two or more races. Hispanic or Latino of any race were 2.21% of the population. 22.6% were of German, 12.7% English, 11.4% Irish, 8.7% American and 5.8% French ancestry according to Census 2000.

There were 421 households, out of which 30.4% had children under the age of 18 living with them, 51.1% were married couples living together, 10.2% had a female householder with no husband present, and 33.0% were non-families. 29.2% of all households were made up of individuals, and 10.5% had someone living alone who was 65 years of age or older. The average household size was 2.32 and the average family size was 2.83.

In the city, the population was spread out, with 27.0% under the age of 18, 4.3% from 18 to 24, 25.3% from 25 to 44, 26.5% from 45 to 64, and 17.0% who were 65 years of age or older. The median age was 40 years. For every 100 females, there were 102.2 males. For every 100 females age 18 and over, there were 99.5 males.

The median income for a household in the city was $32,411, and the median income for a family was $37,813. Males had a median income of $36,250 versus $20,139 for females. The per capita income for the city was $17,330. About 9.3% of families and 12.1% of the population were below the poverty line, including 20.1% of those under age 18 and 9.0% of those age 65 or over.

Infrastructure
State Highway 55 passes through Cascade.

Notable people
Terry Gestrin, member of the Idaho House of Representatives
Ken Roberts, former member of the Idaho House of Representatives
Chris Crutcher, novelist and family therapist
Rod Miller, MLB player
Norman L. Foote, bishop of the Episcopal Diocese of Idaho from 1957 to 1972

References

External links

  - City of Cascade

Cities in Idaho
Cities in Valley County, Idaho
County seats in Idaho